Theodore Bertis Mitchell (October 26, 1890 – February 10, 1983) was an American entomologist.

He composed what is still considered the seminal work in the area of eastern North American bee fauna: Bees of the Eastern United States vols I and II. He was a leading expert on the genus Megachile.

Mitchell was born in Cambridge, Massachusetts, on October 26, 1890. He attended Massachusetts Agricultural College (now called the University of Massachusetts Amherst), from which he graduated with a B.S. degree in 1920. He graduated in 1924 with an M.S. from North Carolina State University and in 1928 with a Sc.D. from Harvard University. From 1920 to 1925 he worked as a plant nursery inspector for the North Carolina Department of Agriculture. In the departments of zoology and entomology of North Carolina State University, he was an assistant professor from 1925 to 1930, an associate professor from 1930 to 1938, and a full professor from 1938 until his retirement as professor emeritus. He died in  Moore County, North Carolina.

Mitchell was elected in 1937 a fellow of the Entomological Society of America.

See also

 List of entomologists
 List of people from Massachusetts

References 

1890 births
1983 deaths
20th-century American zoologists
American entomologists
People from Cambridge, Massachusetts
Hymenopterists
Fellows of the Entomological Society of America
University of Massachusetts Amherst alumni
North Carolina State University alumni
Harvard University alumni